Zygmunt Steuermann (5 February 1899 – December 1941) was a Polish footballer who played as a forward and is one of the most renowned members of the Hasmonea Lwów Football Club.

Life
Born in Sambor, then in Austro-Hungarian Galicia, Steuermann was Jewish and a member of a Polonized Jewish family. His older brother was the pianist Eduard Steuermann. His older sister was the actress and screenwriter Salka Viertel. As a child, he was nicknamed Dusko.

At the age of 12 he joined the local Korona Sambor. During World War I he fled to Vienna, where he continued his training in a variety of sport clubs, including Gersthof Wien, Germania Wien, and Amateure Wien. After the war he returned to Poland and in 1920 started a semi-professional career in Korona Sambor. During the following year he moved to Lwów (modern Lviv, Ukraine), where he joined the ŻKS Lwów sports club. In 1923 he was transferred to Hasmonea Lwów, the most important Jewish football club in Poland and one of the four Lwów-based clubs playing in the first league. He remained one of the most notable players of that club until 1932, when he joined Legia Warsaw.

He also played twice in the Poland national team, scoring four goals: three in a match against Turkey in 1926 and one against the USA in 1928. He was one of only two first-timers in the history of the Poland national team to score a hat-trick in the first match, the other being Józef Korbas (in 1937 against Bulgaria).

During the Nazi and Soviet invasion of Poland in 1939 he fled Warsaw and settled in his hometown, which was then annexed by the USSR. He returned to Korona Sambor, which was soon afterwards closed down and recreated as Dinamo Sambor by the Soviet authorities. Following the Nazi take-over of eastern Poland, he was arrested and sent to the Lemberg Ghetto, where he died in December 1941 aged 42.

Clubs 
1920–1921 Korona Sambor
1921 ŻKS Lwów
1923–1932 Hasmonea Lwów
1929 Legia Warsaw
1930–1932 Hasmonea Lwów
1932–1939 Korona Sambor
1940–1941 Dinamo Sambor

References

External links
 Photograph of Steuermann (far left) and his club; photographs of his siblings, mainly of his brother Eduard Steuermann

1899 births
1941 deaths
Polish footballers
Association football forwards
Poland international footballers
Jews from Galicia (Eastern Europe)
Austro-Hungarian Jews
Polish Austro-Hungarians
People from the Kingdom of Galicia and Lodomeria
People from Sambir
People who died in the Lwów Ghetto
Polish civilians killed in World War II
Polish Jews who died in the Holocaust
Jewish Polish sportspeople
Jewish footballers